Richard Gardiner may refer to:
Sir Richard Gardiner (politician) (died 1489), Lord Mayor of London and member of parliament
Richard Gardiner (Irish priest), Dean of St Patrick's Cathedral, Dublin, 1238–1250
Richard Gardiner (English divine) (1591–1670), English divine
Ricky Gardiner (born 1948), Scottish guitarist and composer

See also
Richard Gardiner Willis (1865–1929), Canadian politician
Richard Gardner (disambiguation)